Amando Miguel Moreno Magaña (born September 10, 1995) is a professional footballer who plays as a forward and winger for USL Championship club New Mexico United. Born in the United States, he represents the El Salvador national team.

Career

New York Red Bulls
Moreno joined the New York Red Bulls Academy in November 2009 and played for the under-15, under-16, and under-18 sides. While playing for the under-16s Moreno scored 33 goals from 2010–2012. He also played at Marlboro High School (New Jersey) for three years, but would forgo his senior season to join the Red Bulls Academy team.

Moreno signed his first professional contract for the New York Red Bulls on December 11, 2012. He made his professional debut for the Red Bulls on March 10, 2013 against the San Jose Earthquakes at Buck Shaw Stadium coming on as a late substitute for Roy Miller in a match the Red Bulls lost 2–1.

Club Tijuana
Moreno announced his move to Club Tijuana in February 2014. After his previous contract expired, he rejected a new one with the New York Red Bulls and joined Club Tijuana.

On April 16, 2016, Moreno made his Liga MX debut after coming on at the 86th minute in Tijuana's 2-1 loss to Monterrey. Prior to his debut, Moreno had appeared in 15 Copa MX games with Tijuana. He scored his first goal with Tijuana on February 17, 2015 in a 2-2 draw with Zacatepec in Copa MX.
 On March 3, 2015 he helped lead Tijuana to a 2-0 victory in Copa MX over Universidad de Guadalajara, scoring the final goal of the match.

Moreno was an important player for Tijuana during the Apertura 2016 Copa MX. On July 19, 2016 he scored for Los Xolos in a 3-0 cup victory over Toluca. On August 17, 2016 he scored the lone goal for Tijuana in a 1-1 draw with Lobos BUAP.

Dorados de Sinaloa
Moreno was sent on loan to Dorados of Ascenso MX during June 2017. On September 12, 2017 he scored his first goal for Dorados in a 2-1 victory over Universidad de Guadalajara in  Copa MX. On October 13, 2017 Moreno scored his first league goal for Dorados in a 2-1 loss to Cafetaleros de Tapachula.

Return to Red Bulls
On January 10, 2018 it was announced that Moreno had returned to his first club signing with New York Red Bulls. He was later waived by the Red Bulls, and signed to New York Red Bulls II on a USL contract. On March 31, 2018 Moreno scored his first two goals for New York in a 5-2 victory over Charleston Battery, for his efforts he was named to the USL Team of the Week. On October 27, 2018 Moreno scored the lone goal for New York in a 1-0 victory over FC Cincinnati, with the victory New York ended Cincinnati's record 24-game unbeaten run and advanced to the Eastern Conference Final for the third straight year.

International
Moreno has represented the United States at the Under-18 level. He was eligible to represent Mexico, due to his father, or El Salvador, due to his mother.

U.S. U-20 MNT head coach Tab Ramos called up Moreno for the U-21 International National Teams Football Tournament from November 9–19 in Marbella, Spain.

Moreno was called up to the United States senior team for a May 2016 friendly against Puerto Rico.

Moreno received a Salvadoran passport in June 2021 making him eligible for inclusion in the El Salvador National Team. On July 1, 2021, Moreno was called up to El Salvador's 2021 CONCACAF Gold Cup squad. He made his senior debut for La Selecta July 4, 2021, in a friendly match against Qatar.

Honours
New York Red Bulls
 MLS Supporters' Shield: 2013

Career statistics

Club

International

References

External links 
 
 
 

1995 births
Living people
Sportspeople from Perth Amboy, New Jersey
Salvadoran footballers
El Salvador international footballers
American soccer players
United States men's youth international soccer players
United States men's under-20 international soccer players
Salvadoran people of Mexican descent
American sportspeople of Mexican descent
American sportspeople of Salvadoran descent
Citizens of El Salvador through descent
New York Red Bulls players
Club Tijuana footballers
New York Red Bulls II players
Chicago Fire FC players
New Mexico United players
Association football forwards
Soccer players from New Jersey
Major League Soccer players
Sportspeople from the New York metropolitan area
2015 CONCACAF U-20 Championship players
USL Championship players
Homegrown Players (MLS)
2021 CONCACAF Gold Cup players
Dorados de Sinaloa footballers
Expatriate footballers in Mexico